Olavale Olaytanovych Fabunmi (born 18 January 1992) is a professional Ukrainian football defender of Nigerian descent who currently plays for amateur club FC Chayka.

Fabunmi is a product of FC Vidradnyi and FC Arsenal Sportive Schools in Kyiv.

He played half-year on loan for FC Slavutych Cherkasy in the Ukrainian Second League in 2012.

References

External links
 

1992 births
Living people
Footballers from Kyiv
FC Cherkashchyna players
Ukrainian footballers
FC Arsenal Kyiv players
SC Chaika Petropavlivska Borshchahivka players
FC Olimpiya Savyntsi players
Ukrainian Premier League players
Ukrainian people of Nigerian descent
Association football defenders